Lumle is a town and village development committee in Kaski District in the Gandaki Zone of northern-central Nepal At the time of the 1991 Nepal census it had a population of 4,685 persons living in 955 individual households.

Lumle is well known for its agricultural centre on a hillside above the village founded in 1968 to train British Gurkha Ex-servicemen farmers.  Its role was widened in 1975 to benefit the communities from which Gurkhas were recruited in Mid-West Hills.  It is now part of Nepal Agricultural Research Council.

Localities 

 Tanchowk

Educational Institutions in Lumle
 Balmandir Community School ( Community)
 Future Star English Boarding School (Private)
 Shree Siddha lower secondary school (Government)
 Shree Sangam Secondary School (Government)
 Srijana Secondary School (Government)
 Shree Paudurkot lower secondary school (Government)

Climate

References

External links
UN map of the municipalities of Kaski District

Populated places in Kaski District